The 2015–16 season is FC Sheriff Tiraspol's 19th season, and their 18th in the Divizia Naţională, the top-flight of Moldovan football. Sheriff Tiraspol are the current defending champions of the Moldovan Cup, and were knocked out of the Europa League by Norwegian side Odds BK, whilst defeating FC Milsami Orhei in the Moldovan Super Cup.

Season events
Prior to the start of the season, 27 May 2015, Lilian Popescu was appointed as Sheriff Tiraspol's new manager.

Squad

Out on loan

Transfers

In

Out

Loans in

Loans out

Released

Friendlies

Competitions

Moldovan Super Cup

Divizia Națională

Results summary

Results

Golden Match

League table

Moldovan Cup

UEFA Europa League

Qualifying rounds

Squad statistics

Appearances and goals

|-
|colspan="14"|Players who left Sheriff Tiraspol during the season:

|-
|colspan="14"|Players who appeared for Sheriff Tiraspol no longer at the club:

|}

Goal scorers

Disciplinary record

References

External links 
 

FC Sheriff Tiraspol seasons
Moldovan football clubs 2015–16 season